Longneck eels or neck eels are a family, Derichthyidae, of eels. They are pelagic fishes, found in the middle and depths of most oceans. The name comes from Greek deres meaning "neck" and ichthys meaning "fish".

They are distinguished by the presence of a series stripes on the head that form part of the sensory system, but otherwise the two genera of the family are quite different in appearance. Derichthys has a narrow neck and large eyes, while Nessorhamphus''' has a long, flattened, snout.

Species
The three species in two genera are:

 Genus Derichthys (one species)
 Genus Nessorhamphus (two species)

In some classifications (for example, Systema Naturae 2000), this family is split in two, with Derichthyidae containing only the genus Derichthys, and Nessorhamphus'' being assigned its own family, Nessorhamphidae.

References

 
Fish of the Atlantic Ocean
Fish of the Pacific Ocean
Fish of the Indian Ocean